The Estadio Cubierto Newell's Old Boys (English: "Covered Stadium of Newell's Old Boys") is an indoor arena that is located in Rosario, Argentina. It is primarily used for basketball games, and other indoor sporting events. It holds 7,500 people for basketball games, and up to 11,400 spectators for concerts.

It was opened in 1978 and in 1982 hosted the II South American Games.

Events

II South American Games
1982 FIVB Volleyball Men's World Championship
1990 FIBA World Championship
1993 FIVB Volleyball Men's U21 World Championship
1996 FIBA Intercontinental Cup
Several Argentina matches for the FIVB Volleyball World League between 1997 and 2002.
2017 FIVB Volleyball Girls' U18 World Championship
2018 FIBA Under-17 Basketball World Cup

Shows

Some of the artists that have played at this stadium are Ramones, Patricio Rey y sus Redonditos de Ricota, Ska-P, Joan Manuel Serrat, Luis Miguel, Soledad Pastorutti, Chayanne, Thalía, Teen Angels, Los Nocheros, Los Piojos and La Renga.

External links
EL ESTADIO ESTARÁ COLMADO
Venue information 

Newells Old Boys